Nancy, Please is a 2012 American drama film directed by Andrew Semans. It stars Will Rogers as Paul, a PhD candidate struggling to complete his thesis who gets into a seemingly insignificant conflict with his former roommate, Nancy (Eléonore Hendricks), over a missing book. Paul's partner, Jen (Rebecca Lawrence Levy), and his friend, Charlie (Santino Fontana), unsuccessfully try to help resolve the conflict.

Critical response
Nancy, Please has received favorable reviews from film critics. Rotten Tomatoes reports 100% positive reviews and an average rating of 7.8/10 from 8 critics, while Metacritic reports an average score of 76/100 from 5 critics. Jeannette Catsoulis in The New York Times appreciates the "tone that’s precisely balanced between terror and farce". In The Hollywood Reporter, Frank Scheck writes that "Andrew Semans presents an engrossing psychological thriller for his feature debut."

References

External links
 
 
 
 

2012 films
2012 drama films
American drama films
2010s English-language films
2012 directorial debut films
2010s American films